is a former Japanese football player.

Playing career
Usui was born in Yokohama on July 16, 1979. He joined J1 League club Bellmare Hiratsuka (later Shonan Bellmare) from youth team in 1998. He played many matches as right side midfielder. However the club was relegated to J2 League from 2000. He also could hardly play in the match in 2000 and left the club end of 2000 season. After 1 year blank, he joined his local club Yokohama FC. He became a regular player as right side back and right side midfielder. In 2005, he moved to Montedio Yamagata. He played as regular right side back. In 2008, he moved to Shonan Bellmare for the first time in 8 years. He played as regular right side back and the club was promoted to J1 from 2010. In 2010, although he played in J1 for the first time in 11 years, the club finished at bottom place and was relegated to J2 in a year. In 2012, he moved to Tochigi SC. However he could hardly play in the match and retired in July 2012.

Club statistics

References

External links

1979 births
Living people
Association football people from Kanagawa Prefecture
Japanese footballers
J1 League players
J2 League players
Shonan Bellmare players
Yokohama FC players
Montedio Yamagata players
Tochigi SC players
Association football defenders